Veerpur is a village of Etawah district, Uttar Pradesh, located about  from Aheripur.

Villages in Etawah district